José Luis Appleyard (5 May 1927 – 1998) was a Paraguayan poet.

Childhood and youth 

He was born in Asunción, capital city of Paraguay.

He completed his primary studies in "la Escuela Normal de Profesores". He attended high school at the Colegio de San José de Asunción, but finished at Colegio San Martín, de Buenos Aires, Argentina.

He studied law at Universidad Nacional de Asunción and after graduating, he worked as a lawyer for approximately ten years. After this, he decided to dedicate himself to journalism and poetry.

First steps 

He was one of the favourite disciples of César Alonso de las Heras, a priest in Colegio de San José. Father Alonso is a fundamental figure regarding the diffusion of Spanish poetry of what are called the '98 and '27 generations. He was also the mentor of numerous talented poets and writers. First from the Academia Literaria del Colegio de San José, and then from the Academia Universitaria, being president and active referent of this last.

Appleyard was part of the so called "the fifties generation" in Paraguayan poetry, along with other icons like José María Gómez Sanjurjo, Ricardo Mazó and Ramiro Domínguez, amongst others.

For almost two decades he was part of the body of journalists of the La Tribuna newspaper of Asunción. He was also "Boss of the Culture Area" and director of the cultural supplement published on Sundays. He was editor of "Monólogos" an important column which influenced people and achieved great popularity by writing about subjects of interest in the time such as "how people speak in Paraguay". Likewise, he worked in Ultima Hora, newspaper where "Desde el tiempo que vivo" his column, was one of the most expected by the thousands of readers.

Being invited by many countries, such as United States of North America and Germany, amongst others, he visited numerous nations in which he gave conferences, chats and presented his poems.

Trajectory 

He was President of the PEN Club del Paraguay and, being an important member of Academia Paraguaya de la Lengua Española, he was a secretary of this important cultural institution.

The also poet and literary critique Roque Vallejos writes in the epilogue of the book "José-Luis Appleyard - Antología poética" published in 1996: "...He has poems of notable social sarcasm that Rafael Barret would have wanted to include in his "Moralidades actuales". So as in his poem "Hay un sitio" que that states in one of its fragments: There are synonyms clear, translucent: / being free is growing without will / to steal is to rob, love is hate, / and to live is to die defenceless / loneliness is called company/ and betraying is to be loyal to your friends. / The news are old. All that's new/ has a dark old shining. Discreetly and with no violence, Appleyard faithfully and severely describes the state of spiritual and semantic emptiness of the words and trapped feeling that the dictatorship carried within for more than thirty. A poet that has based all his pieces on freedom couldn't –nor has tried to do so- defend a dogmatic moral that would have fatally led him to mere materialist doctrinism ".

Hugo Rodríguez-Alcalá, paraguayan literature investigator wrote in his book "Appleyard da a la estampa"... the best in his promotion:… Amongst those of the Academia Universitaria, Appleyard is the one who best fulfills the following subjects: the longing for lost times, the teen love, the magic of childhood. All these subjects are mentioned in "Entonces era siempre", anthology of poems in which the poet reviews childhood".

Style 

Appleyard himself, in a brief script of June 1981 that introduces his book "Tomado de la mano", expresses the following in relation to his poems: "And this is how, grabbing hands with them, I have found myself in a long journey of years, days and hours that have granted me a bit of everything.

In this path expressed in my verses I have felt sad and happy, I have felt overwhelmed by loneliness and yet more by company. I have seen myself as a child in Areguá. I have seen myself as a young student in Buenos Aires. I have felt as if I were in Academia Universitaria again feeling that beautiful rush that a group of friends generates. And I have also seen myself, with white hair, white bearb, just as I am today". And he adds: "The eyes of those who read me won't see what I see . But they might build the image of a road in which edges life is found. If this is so, my verses would have had accomplished their mission of leaving my voice within these pages. If not, these poems will always be my sons that in most cases were born in painful desperation, sons of mine that were left defenceless, alone and defenceless of the one that gave them life through a poem. They remain with the reader, lost and lonely, those poems. Let them say if they have it… their truth.

Distinctions 

In 1961 he won the Municipal Award of Theater with the poetic drama about the Paraguayan independence, "Aquel 1811".

In 1997, he received Paraguay's National Prize for Literature for his book Cenizas de la vida.

Last years 

He died in Asunción in 1998.

Works 

Even though he has written many other brief pieces, most of his theatrical production remains inedited.

References 

 Centro Cultural de la República El Cabildo
 Diccionario Biográfico "FORJADORES DEL PARAGUAY", Primera Edición Enero de 2000. Distribuidora Quevedo de Ediciones. Buenos Aires, Argentina.

External links 
Palabra Virtual
Poesía Castellana
Members
Poemas-Poetas
 http://www.abc.com.py/seccion/poemasradio/
 http://www.poesiacastellana.es
Jose Luis Appleyard recorded at the Library of Congress for the Hispanic Division's audio literary archive on January 13, 1983

1927 births
1998 deaths
20th-century Paraguayan poets
Paraguayan male poets
Universidad Nacional de Asunción alumni
People from Asunción
Paraguayan journalists
Male journalists
Paraguayan dramatists and playwrights
Male dramatists and playwrights
20th-century dramatists and playwrights
20th-century Paraguayan lawyers
20th-century male writers
20th-century journalists